David Mahoney (born April 14, 1981) is an American soccer goalkeeper, who formerly played for the Chicago Fire of Major League Soccer.

Mahoney played college soccer at Brown University during the 2001 and 2002 seasons before transferring to Cornell University for 2003 and 2004. During his college years he was prolific in the Premier Development League, playing for Bradenton Academics and Cape Cod Crusaders.  In 2005, he played one game for the Western Mass Pioneers.

He began his professional career with the Chicago Fire in 2005 as part of the newly formed MLS Reserve Division.  He got his first call up after the two other goalkeepers on the Chicago Fire, Zach Thornton and Matt Pickens became injured.  He started 3 games in October with a record of 1-1-1 with a 1.33 GAA, 7 saves and 1 shutout (10/01 @ Kansas City).  In 2006, the Fire sent Mahoney on loan with the Seattle Sounders in the USL First Division.

Mahoney was released by the Fire in 2007 when Jon Busch was picked up off waivers.

In June 2014 Mahoney married longtime girlfriend Rachel Buchanan in Chicago.

References

External links
 2006 Seattle Sounders Media Guide
 

1981 births
Living people
American soccer players
Association football goalkeepers
Brown Bears men's soccer players
Cape Cod Crusaders players
Chicago Fire FC draft picks
Chicago Fire FC players
Cornell Big Red men's soccer players
IMG Academy Bradenton players
Major League Soccer players
People from Wellesley, Massachusetts
Seattle Sounders (1994–2008) players
Soccer players from Massachusetts
USL First Division players
USL League Two players
Western Mass Pioneers players